Tessa ter Sluis (born 16 January 1995 in Sint Willebrord) is a Dutch professional squash player. As of March 2022, she is ranked number 62 in the world. , her highest ranking is number 56. She has been in the Netherlands women's national squash team since 2014.   

Find more information on her own website: www.tessatersluis.com  

Degree 

Tessa went to RSG t' Rijks to get her VWO high school diploma. Whilst she started playing on the PSA World Tour in 2014, she decided to study for a few more years. She studied Sportmarketing at the Johan Cruyff University, a hbo programme set up for athletes. In 2018 she got her degree and she went on to play on the tour full time.  

Squash 

Tessa started playing squash at the age of 8. Together with her brother she started to train and play junior tournaments. She loved playing squash and chose to only play squash. From there she played national and international events. Won many national junior titles and even got selected for the european and world championships.  

In 2014 she started playing on the PSA world tour, previously known as WISPA. In that same year she got selected for the women's national team for the first time.   

Sponsors 

Tessa is currently sponsored by multiple companies, such as VitOrtho voedingssupplementen, BRESS breda, Houtrust Squash and Decathlon Nederland.

References

1995 births
Living people
Dutch female squash players
Sportspeople from Rucphen
Competitors at the 2017 World Games